"I have no enemies: My final Statement" (Chinese: 我沒有敵人──我的最後陳述) was an essay written by Nobel Peace Prize laureate Liu Xiaobo intended to be read at his trial in December 2009. 

Liu was charged with the crime of "inciting subversion of state power". He came before the court in Beijing, China on 23 December 2009, and was sentenced to an 11-year imprisonment on 25 December. 

Although Liu was never allowed to be heard during his trial, the essay was later published and was well received. It became the laureate's speech delivered by Liv Ullmann at the award ceremony for the 2010 Nobel Peace Prize ceremony on 10 December 2010.

References

External links 
 I Have No Enemies: My Final Statement
2010 speeches
2009 in China
2009 essays
Politics of China